Steve Riley (born January 22, 1956) is an American rock drummer, best known for his work with Keel, W.A.S.P., and L.A. Guns.

Career 

After graduating high school in the 70s, Riley moved to Los Angeles to pursue a music career. In 1979, he joined a revival of Steppenwolf, but the lineup broke up later that year.

Riley joined up-and-coming L.A. band Keel and recorded their breakthrough album The Right to Rock with them in 1984. Later that year, Riley departed Keel to replace founding member Tony Richards in W.A.S.P., another L.A. band whose debut album had recently achieved gold status in sales. As a member of W.A.S.P., Riley performed on the albums The Last Command, Inside the Electric Circus, and Live...In the Raw. Vocalist Ron Keel has described Riley as "driven to succeed and to play". Keel applauded Riley's decision to leave his band for the opportunity with W.A.S.P., saying "I mean, you've got to be ready for those opportunities when they knock". Keel and Riley remain friends.

Riley left W.A.S.P. and immediately joined rising Sunset Strip band L.A. Guns in 1987, becoming part of the band's "classic" lineup alongside guitarists Tracii Guns and Mick Cripps, vocalist Phil Lewis and bassist Kelly Nickels. He appeared on the albums Cocked & Loaded, and Hollywood Vampires.
Riley was fired from the band in 1992 but returned in 1995.

In 2006, there were two L.A. Guns lineups, Phil Lewis's and Tracii Guns's. Riley was a member of Lewis's lineup until it folded in 2016 when merging with Guns's version. Subsequently, Riley created his own version of L.A. Guns in 2019.  This version released an album, Renegades, through Golden Robot records.  Following lawsuits over the band name, a settlement was reach in April 2021, allowing this band to continue as Riley's L.A. Guns.

Discography

With Roadmaster 
 Roadmaster (1976)

With The Lawyers 
 The Lawyers (1981)

With The B'zz 
 Get Up (1982)

With Keel 
 The Right to Rock (1985)

With W.A.S.P. 
 The Last Command (1985)
 Inside the Electric Circus (1986)
 Live...In the Raw (1987)

With L.A. Guns 
L.A. Guns (1988) (Track 12)
 Cocked & Loaded (1989)
 Hollywood Vampires (1991)
Cuts (1992)  (Tracks 5-7)
 American Hardcore (1996)
 Wasted (1998)
 Shrinking Violet (1999)
 Greatest Hits and Black Beauties (1999)
 Man in the Moon (2001)
 Waking the Dead (2002)
 Rips the Covers Off (2004)
 Tales from the Strip (2005)
 Covered in Guns (2010)
 Hollywood Forever (2012)
Renegades (2020)

References

External links 
 L.A. Guns official website

Living people
People from Revere, Massachusetts
American rock drummers
Glam metal musicians
L.A. Guns members
W.A.S.P. members
Musicians from Massachusetts
Steppenwolf (band) members
1956 births
20th-century American drummers
American male drummers
Keel (band) members